The Logan Temple Barn was built in Logan, Utah in 1896–97 to house the animals belonging to Mormons working at or attending the nearby Logan Temple. It is unique as one of only two stone barns in the Cache Valley, where wood-frame barns prevailed. The temple barn fell into disuse after automobiles began to bring worshipers to the temple and was sold in 1919, becoming an automobile repair shop. The owner at this time was Dr. Thomas B. Budge, who owned the Utah-Idaho Hospital across the street, later the William Budge Memorial Hospital. During the 1980s a conversion to apartment use was proposed but not pursued.

Description
A pigeon-house cupola was added to the top by its first private owner. The front and rear elevations have double doors to the ground floor, and there is an original doorway on the east side. Two more openings on the east and west sides were added in 1919 using concrete lintels in lieu of the original openings' stone arches and lintels. There is a hayloft door on the eastern side and several old and new window openings on all sides. The interior is dominated by a central bearing wall supporting the wood framed floor and roof.

The Logan Temple Barn was placed on the National Register of Historic Places on December 19, 1985.

References

External links

 

Buildings and structures completed in 1897
Buildings and structures in Logan, Utah
Historic American Buildings Survey in Utah
Barns on the National Register of Historic Places in Utah
Barns in Utah
National Register of Historic Places in Cache County, Utah